Chief Buffalo may refer to any number of people:

Ojibwe 

 Chief Buffalo or Kechewaishke (1759–1855), Ojibwa chief of the La Pointe Band of Lake Superior Chippewa
 Buffalo, an Ojibwa chief of the St. Croix Band
 Beshekee (Buffalo), an Ojibwa chief of the Leech Lake Band

Sioux 

 Buffalo, a Dakota chief about St. Croix River
 Black Buffalo (chief) (1767–1823), Sioux leader

Other 

 White Buffalo (Cheyenne leader) (1862–1929), chief of the Northern Cheyenne
 Buffalo Hump, Comanche leader
 Chief Buffalo Child Long Lance (1890–1932), journalist, soldier and Native American impostor